Aguri, also known as Ugra Kshatriya, is an agricultural caste or community of Hindus found in the districts of Bardhaman, Birbhum, Hooghly and Bankura in the state of West Bengal in India. Aguris are now considered as a middle-caste group and according to Gail Omvedt, constitute "more prosperous owner-peasants" among the peasant communities of Bengal.

History 
Aguris are a cultivating and trading caste. According to Santosh Kumar Kundu, they were brought by the ruler of Burdwan from Agra to West Bengal to fight against the British colonists. William Benjamin Oldham, a British civil servant and ethnographer who wrote Some Historical and Ethnical Aspects of Burdwan District (1891), said that they originated from marriage alliances between the Sadgop rulers of Gopbhum and the Khatri rulers of Burdwan. He based this on the Aguri's own account but McLane believes that Oldham was misled by the Aguri. Citing a 1589 work by Mukundaram. McLane says that the Aguri were present "almost certainly" before the arrival of the Khatris in Burdwan.

Manu, a Hindu religious text, says Ugra (meaning aggressive) was born to a Shudra girl by a Kshatriya father. This mixed origin meant that the community was considered to have an ambivalent position in the Hindu varna system, although by the 1960s they were claiming to be Kshatriya.

Culture 
Around the beginning of the 20th century, the Aguri were among the agricultural communities that still predominantly adhered to the custom of paying a bride price at the time of marriage, although some more prosperous members among them were already adopting the increasingly common alternative of paying a dowry. This minority believed that bride price was deprecated by higher castes.

References 

Bengali Hindu castes
Social groups of West Bengal